Amauta hodeei is a moth in the Castniidae family. It is found in Colombia.

Subspecies
Amauta hodeei hodeei (Colombia)
Amauta hodeei kruegeri (Niepelt, 1927) (Colombia)

References

Moths described in 1881
Castniidae